Carole Gray Bamford, Baroness Bamford, OBE ( Whitt; born 1946), is a British business person who founded the Daylesford Organic Farmshops chain and the Bamford brand of women's products.

Personal life

Carole Bamford (née Carole Gray Whitt) was born in Nottingham. She is married to the billionaire industrialist Anthony, Lord Bamford, and is a director of his family's JCB construction company. The family business has made significant donations to the Conservative Party, in particular during the 2010 general election.

She married Bamford in 1974. They live on a 1500-acre estate near Chipping Norton in the Cotswolds. They have one daughter and two sons. Her son, Jo Bamford, is the heir to JCB and the owner of Wrightbus.

In the 2006 New Year Honours, Bamford was appointed OBE for her services to children and families.

Business interests

Bamford brand 
A Bamford store opened in Gloucestershire in 2004. The Bamford Haybarn Spa opened the following year, and a second spa site was opened in London in November 2018.

Daylesford 

Bamford started converting the family's farms in Staffordshire and Gloucestershire to organic farming. This led to the opening of a farm shop and café in 2002 on the Daylesford House estate in Gloucestershire, and creation of an organic deer farm on the Wootton Lodge estate in Staffordshire.

At a trade event in 2012, Daylesford Farmshop at online retailer Ocado was awarded 'best organic retailer'.

Philanthropy 

In India, the Lady Bamford Charitable Trust (formed in 2000) has built schools and communities around JCB factories in Delhi, Ballabgarh, Ladhiapur and Ambi. Similar projects have been developed around other JCB factories. In South America, the Fundação Lady Bamford opened in 2009, and in the USA, The Lady Bamford Center for Early Childhood Development in Savannah, Georgia was opened in 2007.  In June 2012 she received an International Leadership Award at the Global Green Millennium Awards.

In the UK, Bamford works closely with NSPCC, the Soil Association and Slow Food Movement.

References

External links 
Carole Bamford Holistic Living
Bamford
Daylesford Organic
Daylesford Foundation
Lady Bamford Early Learning Center

1946 births
Living people
British baronesses
People from Nottingham
21st-century British businesspeople
British philanthropists
21st-century British farmers
Officers of the Order of the British Empire
National Society for the Prevention of Cruelty to Children people
Spouses of life peers